Message in a Box: The Complete Recordings is a four-CD box set by the Police, containing all five of their studio albums in chronological order, as well as non-album singles, non-album B-sides, and tracks from various compilation albums and the Brimstone & Treacle soundtrack (1982). The box set also comes with a 68-page booklet.

Contents
The box set states that it 'contains every single song the Police ever released' but it excludes ten officially released tracks from before its release in 1993:
 "De Do Do Do, De Da Da Da" (Spanish Version) (4:00) and "De Do Do Do, De Da Da Da" (Japanese Version) (4:00) were released in the US in 1981 as a double A-side 7", with Sting singing the song in both Spanish and Japanese (AM-25000).
 "Truth Hits Everybody" (Remix) (3:30) appeared as the A-side of the bonus single, which was included in the UK 7" limited edition double pack of "Every Breath You Take" (AM 117/AM*01).
 "Every Breath You Take" (Backing Track) (4:05) and "Roxanne" (Backing Track) (3:11) were released in Japan in 1983 as a double A-side 7" (AMP-782).
 "Wrapped Around Your Finger" (Live Version) (5:22) from Atlanta in 1983 was included on the US 12" Promo of "Wrapped Around Your Finger" (SP-17264).
 "Don't Stand So Close to Me '86" (4:47) appeared as the A-side of the UK 7" of "Don't Stand So Close to Me '86" (AMY 354) and then released on the album Every Breath You Take: The Singles was not included on the UK version of the box set.
 "Don't Stand So Close To Me" (Live) (3:40) from Atlanta in 1983, appeared as the B-side of the UK 7" of "Don't Stand So Close to Me '86" (AMY 354).
 "Don't Stand So Close To Me '86" (Dance Mix) (6:32) appeared on the A-side of the UK 12" of "Don't Stand So Close To Me '86" (AMY 354) was not included on the US version of the box set. There is no edition of the box set that includes both the standard version and the Dance Mix of "Don't Stand So Close To Me '86".
 "Can't Stand Losing You" (Live) (5:30) from the Paris Theatre, London in 1979, appeared on the 1988 Strange Fruit Compilation UK CD 21Years of Alternative Radio1 (SFRCD 200).
 "Shambelle" misses the beginning high hat introduction played by Stewart Copeland making the song incomplete. (2371-S). The full version (5:10) was later released on the "Every Move You Make" 6-CD Box Set in Nov. 2018. There also was a version on the B-Side (5:42) of "Invisible Sun" (AMS 8164).

Reception

Allmusic gave resounding approval to the set, going so far as to claim that all 78 songs are "timeless classics," making it the ideal purchase for the casual listener. They also praised the booklet included, especially the Police biography, and asserted that the digital remastering is so superior to the sound quality of the original releases that they would recommend the purchase even to those who already have all the recordings on the box set.

Track listing

Personnel
The Police
 Stewart Copeland – drums, percussion, keyboards, backing vocals, guitar on "Fall Out", "Nothing Achieving", "It's Alright for You" and "A Sermon", lead vocal on "On Any Other Day", spoken word on "Does Everyone Stare"
 Sting – bass guitar, keyboards, saxophone, oboe, lead and backing vocals, harmonica on "So Lonely", drum machine on "Synchronicity I"
 Andy Summers – guitar, keyboards, bass guitar on "Behind My Camel", backing vocals, piano on "Does Everyone Stare" and "Be My Girl – Sally", spoken word on "Friends", "Dead End Job" and "Be My Girl – Sally", lead vocals on "Mother" and "Someone to Talk To"

Additional
 Henry Padovani – guitar on "Fall Out" and "Nothing Achieving"
 John Sinclair – piano on "Hole in My Life" and "Masoko Tanga"
 Jean Russell – piano on "Every Little Thing She Does is Magic"
 Olaf Kübler – saxophone on "Low Life"
 Suzanna Hamilton – screaming on "A Kind of Loving"

Production
 Dave Collins – Mastering

References

The Police compilation albums
1993 compilation albums
A&M Records compilation albums
Albums produced by Hugh Padgham
Albums produced by Nigel Gray